Puritan Medical Products is an American manufacturer of swab, diagnostic, and specimen collection products. Puritan is North America's largest manufacturer of COVID-19 testing swabs.

Based in Guilford, Maine, Puritan is a subsidiary of Hardwood Products Co., LP (its two subsidiaries being Hardwood Products Co., LLC and Puritan Medical Products Co., LLC). Guilford has been described as America's "swab capital," with Puritan's manufacturing reportedly ushering in the "golden age of the swab."

Puritan operates three facilities in Maine (one in Guilford and two in Pittsfield), as well as a manufacturing plant in Orlinda, Tennessee, producing swabs and diagnostic testing supplies. In June 2022, Puritan was named "Innovator of the Year" by the Maine International Trade Center.

Leadership 
Puritan is a family-owned business. The company is led by co-owner Timothy Templet, who serves as executive vice president of sales. Templet's grandfather, Lloyd Cartwright, founded Puritan in 1919 during the influenza pandemic. His daughter, Virginia Templet, serves as Puritan’s manager of marketing.

A business advocate, Templet urges American workers to join small companies and other private-sector employers as a way of combating labor shortages. He also believes in proactively bracing for the next global health crisis, claiming the COVID-19 pandemic was a "wake-up call about stockpiles and being prepared."

Bob Shultz is the president and CFO at Puritan. He is focused on recruiting workers from rural parts of Maine and Tennessee to join the company. Derek McKenney serves as Puritan's director of corporate engineering.

COVID-19 pandemic 
In April 2020, Puritan received over $75 million from the U.S. Department of Defense to produce more “flock tip testing swabs,” which are preferred for COVID-19 testing. In June 2020, President Trump visited the company, highlighting its “noble tradition of American manufacturing excellence for more than 100 years.” In July 2020, Puritan received another $51 million from the Defense Department to “expand industrial production capacity of flock tip testing swabs.” To meet demand, the company partnered with Cianbro Corp. to open another swab production facility in Pittsfield, Maine. Granted federal funding to churn out 40 million swabs per month, the new Pittsfield facility is hiring and training hundreds of workers to produce up to 100 million swabs a month. In total, the federal government provided Puritan with more than $250 million in funding to accelerate COVID-19 testing swab production.

In November 2020, Puritan was awarded over $11 million to produce three million more testing swabs per month, with the money coming through the Paycheck Protection Program and Health Care Enhancement Act.

In December 2020, Inc. named Puritan the magazine's “Company of the Year,” describing it as “the most important manufacturer in the world.” Governor Janet Mills praised Puritan for "stepping up during tumultuous times to meet the needs of our state." According to Bloomberg, Puritan offers full benefits and pays fully trained employees $15 an hour, higher than the $12.15 hourly minimum wage in Maine.

In April 2021, Puritan announced plans to open a new manufacturing and distribution center in Tennessee, expanding the company’s national presence. With construction underway, the Tennessee plant will create as many as 625 new jobs over the next five years. In addition to accessing a larger workforce than in Maine, Puritan chose the Tennessee location for "the location, logistics, and incentives offered by Tennessee state and county development officials."

References 

Companies based in Piscataquis County, Maine
Guilford, Maine
Emergency medical services